Agia Anna may refer to:

The Greek name for Saint Anne
Agia Anna, Euboea, a village on the island Euboea, Greece
Agia Anna, Elis, a village in Elis, Greece
Agia Anna, Cyprus, a village near Larnaca, Cyprus